Frank Evensen (born 24 July 1962) is a Norwegian judoka. He competed in the men's lightweight event at the 1984 Summer Olympics.

References

1962 births
Living people
Norwegian male judoka
Olympic judoka of Norway
Judoka at the 1984 Summer Olympics
Sportspeople from Tønsberg
20th-century Norwegian people